Isoparce cupressi, the baldcypress sphinx or cypress sphinx, is a moth of the family Sphingidae.

Distribution 
It is found in cypress swamps in from Maryland to Texas. It has been reported from Mexico.

Description 

Biology 
There are at least four generations per year in Louisiana with adults on wing from February to October.

References

External links
Baldcypress Sphinx Moths of North America Guide

Sphingini
Moths described in 1895